Paulus Dussus ( 1440–54) was the Roman Catholic archbishop of Krujë (Craynensis archiepiscopis), also having served as (by year mentioned) the bishop of Šas (or Svač, Suacium, Suacensis) in 1440, bishop of Drivast in 1444 and 1454. According to R. Elsie, he was the bishop of Šas in 1443, and notes that it is uncertain if Paulus Dussus (whom he calls "Pal Dushi") and Paulus Angelus were the same person.

References

Sources

1455 deaths
Year of birth unknown
15th-century Roman Catholic archbishops in Albania
History of Catholicism in Montenegro